is a high-rise building in Nishi-Shinjuku, Shinjuku, Tokyo.

Design
The building's three-sided construction makes good use of available space, yet the building's design sacrifices valuable floor space by including a massive atrium running the entire height of the building. The building's most recognizable characteristic is its shape and structure. It is most simply described as triangular (a more apt description would be a triangle with all the corners cut off), hence why one of its nicknames is 'the Triangle'.  Also distinctive is the visible emergency elevator, which is used to transport cargo and not everyday passengers.

Development
Construction began in November 1971 and was finished on March 6, 1974. At the time of its completion, its elevators were the fastest in the world at 540 meters per minute. It was the tallest building in Tokyo from March to September 1974 when it was surpassed by the Shinjuku Mitsui Building which is located just to the east of the Sumitomo building. It was developed by Sumitomo Realty & Development, the real estate arm of the Sumitomo Group, and previously housed Sumitomo Realty's headquarters.

A pioneering skyscraper in Shinjuku, many companies are tenants of the building, as well as several restaurants. The free observation deck on the 51st floor was closed on April 1, 2017.

Popular culture
In the 1984 film The Return of Godzilla, the Sumitomo Building was knocked over by Godzilla, crushing and breaking the Super X.  Also, in the Doraemon film , the building was accidentally destroyed in the World Inside the Mirror by the huge robot Zanda Claus.

See also
 List of tallest structures in Japan

References

External links
Official web site of the building (in Japanese)
Shinjuku Sumotomo Triangle Street (in Japanese)

Skyscrapers in Shinjuku
Skyscraper office buildings in Tokyo
Office buildings completed in 1974
1974 establishments in Japan
Triangular buildings